List of protected areas of Indiana
This list of protected areas of Indiana includes national forest lands, Army Corps of Engineers areas, state parks, state forests, state nature preserves, state wildlife management areas, and other areas.

Federal lands

National Park Service, Department of the Interior
George Rogers Clark National Historical Park
Indiana Dunes National Park
Lewis and Clark National Historic Trail
Falls of the Ohio State Park
Lincoln Boyhood National Memorial

U.S. Forest Service, Department of Agriculture
Hoosier National Forest

U.S. Fish and Wildlife Service, Department of the Interior
 Big Oaks National Wildlife Refuge
 Muscatatuck National Wildlife Refuge
 Patoka River National Wildlife Refuge

Army Corps of Engineers, Department of Defense
Brookville Lake Dam 
Cagles Mill Lake
Cannelton Locks and Dam 
Cecil M Harden Lake Project (at Ferndale, Indiana)
Falls of the Ohio National Wildlife Conservation Area 
J. Edward Roush Lake 
John T. Myers Locks and Dam 
Mississinewa Lake Dam
Lake Monroe (Indiana) 
Newburgh Lock and Dam 
Salamonie Lake Dam

State lands

State parks 
Indiana has 24 state parks maintained and operated by Indiana Department of Natural Resources (IDNR). In addition, a separate state agency operates White River State Park in Indianapolis.

State memorials 
Angel Mounds
Corydon Historic District
Culbertson Mansion State Historic Site
Gene Stratton-Porter Cabin
New Harmony Historic District
Lanier Mansion
Levi Coffin House
Limberlost State Historic Site
T. C. Steele State Historic Site
Vincennes State Historic Site
Whitewater Canal State Historic Site

State forests 

Clark State Forest - 25,288.8 acres (19 km2)
Deam Lake State Recreation Area
Ferdinand State Forest - 7,789.9 acres (10 km2)
Frances Slocum State Forest 
Greene–Sullivan State Forest – 9,048.8 acres (1.3 km2); Athens County
Harrison–Crawford State Forest – 24,322.7 acres (5 km2)
Jackson–Washington State Forest - 18,416.2 acres (38 km2)
Martin State Forest - 7,863.6 acres (12 km2)
Morgan–Monroe State Forest - 25,789.7 acres (17 km2); Ashland County
Mountain Tea State Forest - 1,153 acres (18 km2); Perry County
Owen–Putnam State Forest - 6,589 acres (47 km2)
Pike State Forest - 4,031.5 acres (9 km2)
Ravinia State Forest - 1,500 acres (38 km2)
Salamonie State Forest – 955.8 acres (11 km2); Meigs County
Selmier State Forest – 350.4 acres (241 km2); Scioto and Adams Counties
Starve Hollow Recreation Area - 278 acres (2.6 km2)
Yellowwood  State Forest - 25,084.4 acres (65 km2)

State fish wildlife areas 

Atterbury Fish and Wildlife Area
Blue Grass Fish and Wildlife Area
Chinook Fish and Wildlife Area
Crosley Fish and Wildlife Area
Deer Creek Fish and Wildlife Area
Fairbanks Landing Fish and Wildlife Area
Glendale Fish and Wildlife Area
Goose Pond Fish and Wildlife Area
Hillenbrand Fish and Wildlife Area
Hovey Lake Fish and Wildlife Area
Jasper-Pulaski Fish and Wildlife Area
J.E. Roush Lake Fish and Wildlife Area
Kankakee Fish and Wildlife Area
Kingsbury Fish and Wildlife Area
LaSalle Fish and Wildlife Area
Pigeon River Fish and Wildlife Area
Splinter Ridge Fish and Wildlife Area
Sugar Ridge Fish and Wildlife Area
Tri-County Fish and Wildlife Area
Wabashiki Fish and Wildlife Area
Wilbur Wright Fish and Wildlife Area
Willow Slough Fish and Wildlife Area
Winamac Fish and Wildlife Area

References
Goll, John. Indiana State Parks: A Guide to Hoosier Parks, Reservoirs and Recreation Areas for Campers, Hikers, Anglers, Boaters, Hunters, Nature Lovers, Skiers and Family Vacationers. United States: Glovebox Guidebooks of America, 1995.  .

External links

Indiana Department of Natural Resources

 
 
 
Protected areas
Indiana